...And Then Take You to a Place Where Jars Are Kept is the second album and the third release by the Norwegian stoner rock band Thulsa Doom, released in early 2003. It was the last with lead singer Papa Doom.

Track listing

References

Thulsa Doom (band) albums
2003 albums